Notogomphus flavifrons is a species of dragonfly in the family Gomphidae. It is endemic to Uganda.  Its natural habitats are subtropical or tropical moist lowland forests and rivers. It is threatened by habitat loss.

References

Gomphidae
Endemic fauna of Uganda
Insects of Uganda
Taxonomy articles created by Polbot
Insects described in 1952